WGSX (104.3 FM) is a radio station licensed to Lynn Haven, Florida, United States. The station serves the Panama City area. The station is owned by Gold Standard  Broadcasting, Inc.

History
Previously licensed to Bayamon, Puerto Rico from April, 1980 to August 1995, the station went dark on November 16, 2012. It was operational in 2013 as "Power 104.3", a black gospel station. The station changed its call sign to WGSX on June 8, 2017.

On June 26, 2017, WGSX returned to the air with ESPN sports, branded as "104.3 ESPN Panama City".

References

External links

GSX
Radio stations established in 2009
2009 establishments in Florida
Sports radio stations in the United States
ESPN Radio stations